The men's singles SL3 tournament of the 2019 BWF Para-Badminton World Championships took place from 20 to 25 August.

Seeds 

 Pramod Bhagat (world champion)
 Daniel Bethell (final)
 Manoj Sarkar (semi-finals)
 Ukun Rukaendi (semi-finals)
 Pascal Wolter (group stage)
 Daisuke Fujihara (quarter-finals)
 Mathieu Thomas (first round)
 Umesh Vikram Kumar (quarter-finals)

Group stage 
All times are local (UTC+2).

Group A

Group B

Group C

Group D

Group E

Group F

Group G

Group H

Knock-out stage

Reference 

2019 BWF Para-Badminton World Championships